Lee Blair may refer to:

 Lee Blair (musician) (1903–1966), American jazz banjoist and guitarist
 Lee Blair (artist) (1911–1993), American artist

See also
Blair Lee (disambiguation)